Linwood Earl Forte (born July 25, 1964), known as The Nightstalker, is an American serial killer and rapist who was linked via DNA to a series of rapes and murders committed in Goldsboro, North Carolina in 1990, and is the prime suspect in an unrelated murder in 1994. He was convicted of his confirmed crimes and subsequently sentenced to death, and is currently awaiting execution.

Murders
On May 26, 1990, Forte's first recorded attack occurred at the home of 70-year-old Eliza Jones, whom he attempted to strangle in her bed but had to flee because her daughter arrived home. When questioned about the perpetrator, Jones claimed that she could not remember and could not provide any clues. Approximately two months later, on July 14, 79-year-old Hattie Davis Bonner was found suffocated in her bed in a strikingly similar manner to the previous attack.

On October 6, Forte broke into the home of 78-year-old Alvin Bowen, a retired Southern Bell executive, and his 75-year-old wife Thelma, who was blind. Upon being discovered by Alvin, Forte stabbed the elderly man multiple times before strangling Thelma to death. In an attempt to cover up the crime scene, Forte then used a flammable liquid to set fire to the house and their car. The resulting blaze caught the attention of the neighbors, who quickly alerted the authorities, who managed to put it out before it could reach the couple's bedroom. Despite this, police struggled to gather any useful clues that could lead to the arrest of a viable suspect. So, a reward of $2,000 was offered by the local Crime Stoppers branch to anybody who could provide information leading to an arrest.

Investigation and arrest
The sudden increase of murders in the Goldsboro area alarmed the residents, spreading rumors that a potential serial killer was active in the area. Initially, local police rejected this hypothesis, claiming that beyond some coincidences at the Bowen crime scene and the murder of a waitress at a local restaurant, there was nothing to connect any recent murders. This sentiment eventually changed, however, as investigators noticed striking similarities between the attack on Jones, the murder of Bonner and the double murder of the Bowens. Some of these similarities consisted of all the victims being elderly, the attacks occurring around midnight Friday or early Sunday, the houses next to vacant lots, and the perpetrator strangling or suffocating the female victims. Owing to the lack of clues or any suspects, all four cases eventually went cold, and were considered among the most notorious unsolved murders in the state at the time.
 
In 1996, Forte was convicted of firing a gun inside his home in Dudley. As a convicted felon, he was obliged to submit a DNA sample so it could be entered into CODIS. Five years later, his DNA was linked to the Nightstalker murders, resulting in his subsequent arrest on April 30, 2001, at his workplace in Dudley. While he was awaiting trial at Central Prison, detectives found evidence that supposedly linked him to the 1994 murder of 46-year-old Dora Ann Thomas, who was found raped and strangled at her apartment in Goldsboro on June 30, 1994. He was never brought to trial for this crime but is still considered the prime suspect.

Trial and imprisonment
Forte was eventually brought to trial for the Nightstalker cases. Due to the overwhelming amount of evidence against him, he was swiftly convicted, receiving a death sentence for the murders and four consecutive life sentences for the rapes. Reportedly, the DNA evidence was so conclusive that his attorneys rested their case without calling forward a single witness. The sentence was met with thanks to the prosecutors from some of the victims' family members, as well as tears from many of the jurors.

The following year, his appeal for an unrelated attempted prison escape and assault on a prison guard was rejected by the North Carolina Court of Appeals. As of July 2022, Forte remains on death row, awaiting execution.

See also
 Capital punishment in North Carolina
 List of death row inmates in North Carolina
 List of serial killers in the United States

References

External links
 State v. Forte (2006)
 NCDPS Inmate Information

Living people
1964 births
20th-century American criminals
American male criminals
American people convicted of murder
American people convicted of rape
American prisoners sentenced to death
American prisoners sentenced to life imprisonment
American serial killers
Criminals from North Carolina
Male serial killers
People convicted of murder by North Carolina
Prisoners sentenced to death by North Carolina
Prisoners sentenced to life imprisonment by North Carolina
Violence against women in the United States